USS Waupaca (AOG-46) was a  acquired by the United States Navy for the dangerous task of transporting gasoline to warships in the fleet, and to remote Navy stations.

Waupaca was laid down under a Maritime Commission contract (MC hull 2072) on 23 November 1944, at Bayonne, New Jersey, by the East Coast Shipyard, Inc.; launched on 4 January 1945; sponsored by Miss Muriel A. Porter; and commissioned at Marine Basin, Brooklyn, New York, on 9 February 1945.

World War II service
 
Waupaca got underway on 7 March for Norfolk, Virginia. After conducting shakedown in Chesapeake Bay, the tanker proceeded to the Netherlands West Indies. She arrived at Aruba on 16 April and completed loading a cargo of diesel oil and aviation gasoline the following day. Underway on the 17th, she transited the Panama Canal on the 22d, en route to southern California.

Pacific Ocean operations
 
After discharging her cargo upon arrival at San Diego, California, she underwent repairs in dry dock before she proceeded to Los Angeles, California. Soon after her arrival there, she loaded a cargo of diesel and lubricating oil, got underway for Hawaii on 22 May, and arrived at Pearl Harbor on 7 June.
 
Assigned to Service Squadron 8 upon arrival, Waupaca got underway for the Marshalls on 26 June. She arrived at Eniwetok Atoll on 8 July and reported for duty with Service Division (ServDiv) 102. Based at Eniwetok, the tanker fueled many types of ships—mainly amphibious craft, PC's, and minecraft—from 8 July through the end of hostilities in the Pacific Ocean.

Sighting a floating mine
 
After the surrender of Japan, ServDiv 102 received orders to Tokyo Bay to fuel smaller units of the occupation forces. With a full cargo of diesel and lubricating oils, Waupaca got underway on 7 September, as part of Task Unit (TU) 30.9.21, and proceeded for Tokyo Bay. En route, lookouts sighted a floating, drifting, horn-type mine and notified the Officer in Tactical Command (OTC) of TU 30.9.21, who dispatched a patrol craft to investigate -- PC-825 soon sank the navigational hazard with gunfire.

End-of-war activity
 
Waupaca anchored off Yokosuka, Japan, on the 21st, and shifted alongside the damaged Japanese battleship Nagato on the 30th to serve as a fueling station. The tanker remained in the Tokyo Bay area into the winter and returned to San Francisco, California, on 18 January 1946.

Post-war decommissioning
Decommissioned on 26 March, Waupaca was struck from the Navy List on 1 May, and she was delivered to the Maritime Commission on 1 July 1946. Purchased by the Standard-Vacuum Oil Co., of New York City, New York, on 14 November 1946 and renamed Mei Shan, the tanker sailed under the Stars and Stripes until acquired by the Canadian-based firm of Oriental Trade and Transport Co., Ltd., in 1948. Successively renamed Stanvac 312 and Stanvac Mei Foo, she served under the British flag until 1954, when the Philippine subsidiary of Standard-Vacuum Oil Co., based at Manila, purchased the ship and renamed her Stanvac Visayas II. In 1963, she was acquired by Mobil Oil, Philippines, Inc., and renamed Mobil Visayas; and, in 1970, she was sold and again renamed, this time Lapu-Lapu Carrier, by Del Mar Carriers, Inc., under which name she served, under Philippine registry. Renamed Vira and finally Leap Dal in 1975, she served until 20 November 1977 when she was sold for scrapping.

References

External links
 NavSource Online: Service Ship Photo Archive - AOG-46 Waupaca

Mettawee-class gasoline tankers
Type T1-M-A2 tankers of the United States Navy
Ships built in Bayonne, New Jersey
1945 ships
World War II auxiliary ships of the United States
Ships of ExxonMobil